Milczany  (German Lindenhof) is a settlement in the administrative district of Gmina Bobolice, within Koszalin County, West Pomeranian Voivodeship, in north-western Poland, located within the historical region of Pomerania.

References

Milczany